The Mound of Glory is a memorial complex honouring Soviet soldiers who fought during World War II, located  21 km from Minsk, Belarus on the Moscow Highway. Designed by O.Stakhovich  and sculpted by A.Bembel, it was established in 1969 on the 25th anniversary of the liberation of Belarus during Operation Bagration (1944).

History 
The monument commemorates the Soviet liquidation of a German pocket during Operation Bagration.

On August 18, 1966, the government of the Byelorussian Soviet Socialist Republic decided to construct a monument, to be named the Mound of Glory, in honor of the Soviet soldiers who fought in World War II and the liberation of Belarus. Construction started in November 1967 and was finished in 1969.

In 2021, the Independence Day ceremony was held at the Mound of Glory.

See also
Mamayev Kurgan
Mound of Immortality

References

Buildings and structures in Minsk Region
History of Minsk
Tourist attractions in Minsk Region
Commemorative mounds
Soviet military memorials and cemeteries
Buildings and structures completed in 1969
Monuments and memorials in Belarus
1969 establishments in Belarus